Albanosmilus is an extinct genus of the family Barbourofelidae.
It was previously thought to belong to the false sabre-toothed cat family Nimravidae.

It lived during Middle and Upper Miocene in Europe, Asia, and North America. Albanosmilus was comparatively more bulky and muscular than today's large cats, such as the tiger, and probably resembled a bear-like lion.

References

Barbourofelidae
Miocene mammals of Europe
Miocene mammals of North America
Miocene mammals of Asia
Prehistoric carnivoran genera